The Western Australian Women's Rugby League is the governing body of female rugby league in Western Australia.  It is a member of the Australian Women's Rugby League and Western Australian Rugby League. The organisation is responsible for administering the Western Australia Women's rugby league team.

See also

Rugby league in Western Australia
New South Wales Women's Rugby League
Queensland Women's Rugby League

References

External links

Women's rugby league governing bodies in Australia
Rugby league in Western Australia
Ru
1997 establishments in Australia
Organizations established in 1997